The derailment of a passenger train at Lytham, Lancashire, England  occurred when the front tyre of the locomotive fractured. The crash caused the loss of 15 lives. The accident happened on 3 November 1924 to the 4.40 pm Liverpool express travelling to Blackpool at 5.46 pm. The building was completely demolished and coals from the grate ignited a carriage. The engine toppled over together with two of the carriages.

Investigation

The tread had broken from a large internal blow hole. The defect probably formed during the steel casting operation, and became critical as the tread was worn away. The tyre had been made in 1920, and had run over  before failure. All the other wheels from the same batch were removed from service and broken up, but without finding any cavities in the treads. Pringle also showed how tyre fractures had decreased over the years. In 1880, there were 1238 broken tyres, 577 ten years later and by 1900, the number had dropped to 234. The majority were found on wagons, but by 1920, there were only 20 wheel failures. The drop in failure rate was due to the introduction of the monobloc steel wheel and better inspection and maintenance methods.

See also 

 List of British rail accidents
 Lists of rail accidents

References

 Rolt, L.T.C. (1956 (and later editions)). Red for Danger. Bodley Head / David and Charles / Pan Books.
 Peter R Lewis and Alistair Nisbet, Wheels to Disaster!: The Oxford train wreck of Christmas Eve, 1874, Tempus (2008)

External links
Pathe newsreel

Railway accidents and incidents in Lancashire
Railway accidents in 1924
History of Lancashire
1924 in England
Lytham St Annes
1920s in Lancashire
Derailments in England
1924 disasters in the United Kingdom
November 1924 events